Alan or Allen Gregory may refer to:

Allen Gregory, a Fox animated television show
Dr. Alan Gregory, a fictional psychologist in Stephen White's novels
Alan Gregory (actor) in A Hobo's Christmas

See also